Singing Is Believing is a country/gospel album by Billy "Crash" Craddock. It was released in 1978. The album was produced by Billy "Crash" Craddock and Dale Morris.

Track listing
Gone At Last
Family Bible
How Great Thou Art
Why Me Lord
The Old Rugged Cross
Will The Circle Be Unbroken
Where No One Stands Alone
Softly And Tenderly
Somebody Touched Me
Suppertime
Amazing Grace

References

Billy "Crash" Craddock albums
1978 albums